Andreoli is an Italian surname. Notable people with the surname include:
 Arnaldo Andreoli (1893–1952), Italian gymnast
 Attilio Andreoli (1877–1950), Italian painter
 Carlo Andreoli (1840–1908), Italian pianist
 David Andreoli (born 1982), Swiss-Italian footballer
 Elvia Andreoli (c.1950–2020), Argentine actress
 Evangelista Andreoli (1810–1875), Italian organist and music teacher
 Ezequiel Andreoli (born 1978), Argentine footballer
 Felipe Andreoli (born 1980), Brazilian musician
 Felipe Andreoli (journalist) (born 1980), Brazilian journalist and humorist
 Franco Andreoli (1915–2009), Swiss footballer
 Giorgio Andreoli (died 1553), Italian potter
 Giuseppe Andreoli (painter) (1720–1776), Italian painter
 Giuseppe Andreoli (bassist) (1757–1832), Italian double-bassist
 Guglielmo Andreoli the Elder (1835–1860), Italian pianist
 Guglielmo Andreoli the Younger (1862–1932), Italian pianist, teacher, and composer, brother of the preceding
 John Andreoli (born 1990), American baseball player
 Sergio Andreoli (1922–2002), Italian footballer
 Severino Andreoli (born 1941), Italian cyclist
 Tatiana Andreoli (born 1999), Italian archer

Italian-language surnames
Patronymic surnames
Surnames from given names